Noel Euchuria Cornelius Cantwell (28 February 1932 – 8 September 2005) was an Irish footballer player and sometime cricketer.

Club career
Cantwell was born in Cork, Ireland, and was educated at the Roman Catholic Presentation Brothers College in Cork. Cantwell played as a full-back for Western Rovers, Cork Athletic, West Ham United and Manchester United.

While at West Ham, he featured in the London XI side that competed in the 1955–58 Inter-Cities Fairs Cup final on 1 May 1958. He captained the Hammers to winning the Division Two championship in the 1957–58 season and thereby leading the club into the top flight for the first time since 1932.

In November 1960, Cantwell joined Manchester United for £29,500 which at the time was a record for a full back. He helped the club win the 1965 and 1967 league titles and captained United when winning the 1963 FA Cup Final – just as his fellow countryman Johnny Carey had done in United's previous FA Cup win 15 years earlier.

He also served as Chairman of the Professional Footballers' Association.

International career
Cantwell won 36 full International caps for the Republic of Ireland (typically playing at left full back and on several occasions at centre forward) and he made his debut against Luxembourg in October 1953; his final appearance coming away to Turkey in February 1967. He scored 14 goals including 5 from penalties and also captained the Republic on several occasions including a match against England at Wembley.

Managerial career

In his first managerial role at Coventry City Cantwell had the onerous task of following Jimmy Hill who had taken the club into the First Division for the first time in their history. Cantwell narrowly kept the Sky Blues in the top in his first two seasons before taking them to a sixth-place finish in 1969–70, earning them qualification for the Inter-Cities Fairs Cup (a year before it was replaced by the UEFA Cup).

He departed from Highfield Road on 12 March 1972, but within seven months was back in English football as manager of Peterborough United.

He helped Peterborough win the Fourth Division title in his first full season as manager, before leaving on 10 May 1977 to manage the New England Tea Men.

He returned to Peterborough on 19 November 1986 for a second spell as manager, remaining in this role until he became general manager on 12 July 1988. He was general manager at London Road for a year until he quit football to become licensee of the New Inn at Peterborough, where he remained for ten years until he retired in 1999. He also was landlord of the Bull and Swan in Stamford, Lincolnshire.

Cricket career
Cantwell also played cricket for Cork Bohemians Cricket Club and Ireland as a left-handed batsman and a right-arm medium bowler. He played five times for Ireland making his debut in what was his sole first-class match versus Scotland at Edinburgh in 1956, scoring 31 and 17. His last match for Ireland was against Lancashire in July 1959.

Death
Cantwell died on 8 September 2005 from cancer aged 73. He left a widow Maggie and two children.

His former teams each held a minute's silence for him before their next matches.

Football career statistics
Scores and results list Republic of Ireland's goal tally first, score column indicates score after each Cantwell goal.

References

1932 births
2005 deaths
Deaths from cancer in England
Association footballers from County Cork
Coventry City F.C. managers
Association football fullbacks
Irish cricketers
English Football League players
Manchester United F.C. players
Peterborough United F.C. managers
Republic of Ireland association footballers
Republic of Ireland international footballers
West Ham United F.C. players
League of Ireland players
Cork Athletic F.C. players
Republic of Ireland football managers
Republic of Ireland national football team managers
North American Soccer League (1968–1984) coaches
Ireland (FAI) international footballers
London XI players
People educated at Presentation Brothers College, Cork
Cricketers from County Cork
Irish expatriate sportspeople in the United States
Republic of Ireland expatriate football managers
Expatriate soccer managers in the United States
FA Cup Final players
Publicans